Manon Petit-Lenoir (born 7 December 1998) is a French snowboarder. She competed in the 2022 Winter Olympics, in Women's Snowboard Cross. 

She competed at the 2016 Youth Olympic Games, 2018–19 FIS Snowboard World Cup, 2019–20 FIS Snowboard World Cup, 2020–21 FIS Snowboard World Cup, and  2021–22 FIS Snowboard World Cup.

References 

1998 births
French female snowboarders
Sportspeople from Clermont-Ferrand
Living people
Snowboarders at the 2016 Winter Youth Olympics
Snowboarders at the 2022 Winter Olympics
Olympic snowboarders of France
21st-century French women